Shitsville Express is an Australian factual television series, produced by Cordell Jigsaw Zapruder Productions and broadcast in 2013 on ABC2.

The six-part series examines political issues such as the explosion of alcohol fuelled violence, the gambling epidemic, substandard transport systems, the current housing crisis and the pros and cons of coal seam gas mining. Journalist Joe Hildebrand takes four budding politicians on a confronting and thought-provoking journey into some of Australia's thorniest issues. At the end, all four will put their ideas to a former Prime Minister who has dealt with many issues and who knows the difficulty of making change happen.

Cast
 Jai Martinkovits, 26, is from Sydney and a member of the Liberal Party and a staunch monarchist.
Francis Ventura, 22, is from Melbourne and has been volunteering for the Labor Party since he was nine years old and stood for the seat of Flinders in the 2010 Federal election.
 Madeleine Charles, 24, is a law student from Hobart and member of The Greens.
 Siobhan Harris, 21, is a libertarian from Melbourne and campaigner for the Australian Sex Party.

Episodes
Episode 1: Alcohol-fuelled violence
Episode 2: The gambling epidemic
Episode 3: The pros and cons of coal seam gas mining
Episode 4: Substandard transport systems
Episode 5: The Housing crisis

See also 
 Dumb, Drunk and Racist
 Go Back To Where You Came From

References

External links 
 Shitsville Express – ABC site
 Cordell Jigsaw Zapruder Productions

Australian Broadcasting Corporation original programming
2010s Australian documentary television series
2013 Australian television series debuts